Parbatipur may refer to:
Parbatipur, South 24 Parganas district, West Bengal, India
Parbatipur Upazila, Bangladesh
Parbatipur Junction, Bangladesh
 Parbatipur, Chitwan district, Nepal